"Por Un Segundo" is Aventura's first single from their fifth and final studio album The Last (2009). The song reached number one on the Billboard Hot Latin Tracks chart which was the first time for Aventura. The song was awarded "Tropical Song of the Year" at the Premios Lo Nuestro 2010 awards.

Music video
The music video for "Por un Segundo" starts with Aventura on their tour bus. Max, Henry, and Lenny are talking about a woman Anthony lost and that she is getting married. Anthony walks in, sees the magazine, and starts to remember when they were in love, and what will happen to him if he's not. By the end of the video, he gets over it. The video also features America's Next Top Model winner Jaslene Gonzalez.

Chart performance

References

2009 singles
Aventura (band) songs
Music videos directed by Jessy Terrero
Songs written by Romeo Santos
2009 songs